From the Czech Mills may refer to:
 From the Czech Mills (1925 film), directed by Svatopluk Innemann
 From the Czech Mills (1941 film), directed by Miroslav Cikán